The Roman Catholic People's Party (in Dutch: Roomsch-katholieke Volkspartij, RKVP) was a Dutch Social Catholic political party. The RKVP played only a marginal role in Dutch politics.

Party History
The RKVP was founded in 1923 by Pius Arts. In the 1925 election the party won one seat which was taken by Aarts. In the 1929 election the party lost its one seat. In the 1933 election the party regained one seat. In the same year the party merged with the Catholic Democratic League to form the Catholic Democratic Party. In 1939 this party merged with the Roman Catholic State Party, the larger, centrist, catholic party.

Ideology & Issues
The RKVP combined a conservative Catholic stance on ethical issues with a progressive, leftwing stance on economic issues.

It advocated the interest of Catholic workers and it wanted just taxation and a strong influence of labour unions in companies. It wanted to increase support for large families and also price controls. The party was in favour of private home-ownership and lower rents. It also supported national disarmament.

In ethical issues, it was as conservative as the Roman Catholic State Party, the larger, centrist, Catholic party. It advocated the re-institution of the envoy at the Holy See and an end to the ban on processions.

Leadership & Support
This table shows the RKVP's results in elections to the House of Representatives and Senate, as well as the party's political leadership: the fractievoorzitter, is the chair of the parliamentary party and the lijsttrekker is the party's top candidate in the general election, these posts are normally taken by the party's leader.

Electorate
The party drew most its support from catholic workers from the region around Tiel, Aarts' home town.

References

Catholic political parties
Defunct political parties in the Netherlands
Confessional parties in the Netherlands
Political parties established in 1922
Defunct Christian political parties
Political parties disestablished in 1937
1922 establishments in the Netherlands